Stuart Alan Kulak (born March 10, 1963) is a Canadian former professional ice hockey right wing who spent parts of four seasons in the National Hockey League between 1982 and 1989. Selected by the Vancouver Canucks in the 1981 NHL Entry Draft, he played for the Canucks, Edmonton Oilers, New York Rangers, Quebec Nordiques, and Winnipeg Jets, as well as several teams in the minor leagues.

Playing career
Kulak was born in Edmonton, Alberta. He was selected in the third round, 115th overall, by the Vancouver Canucks in the 1981 NHL Entry Draft from the Victoria Cougars of the WHL. He would make his debut for the team at the age of just 19 in the 1982–83 season, appearing in 4 games and registering a goal and an assist. Considered one of the team's top prospects at this point, his career would go awry the following year when he suffered a serious abdominal injury which required surgery and forced him to miss almost two seasons.

In 1986–87, Kulak would crack the Canucks' roster out of training camp, appearing in 21 games before being waived and claimed by the Edmonton Oilers. He would be dealt again before the end of the season, this time to the New York Rangers. In what would prove to be his only full NHL season, Kulak registered 4 goals and 2 assists in 54 games between Vancouver, Edmonton, and New York.

Kulak would have stints with the Quebec Nordiques and Winnipeg Jets over the next two seasons, but fail to stick full-time. Released by the Jets in 1990, he would spend most of the 1990s in low-end minor pro before finally retiring in 2000.

Kulak appeared in 90 NHL games, registering 8 goals and 4 assists for 12 points, along with 130 penalty minutes.

Career statistics

Regular season and playoffs

External links
 

1963 births
Austin Ice Bats players
Canadian expatriate ice hockey players in the United States
Canadian ice hockey right wingers
Edmonton Oilers players
Erie Panthers players
Fredericton Express players
Fresno Falcons players
Kalamazoo Wings (1974–2000) players
Kansas City Blades players
Las Vegas Flash players
Living people
Moncton Hawks players
New Mexico Scorpions (WPHL) players
New York Rangers players
Oakland Skates players
Quebec Nordiques players
Phoenix Mustangs players
Reno Rage players
Reno Renegades players
Sacramento River Rats players
San Antonio Iguanas players
Ice hockey people from Edmonton
Tilburg Trappers players
Tucson Gila Monsters players
Tulsa Oilers (1992–present) players
Vancouver Canucks draft picks
Vancouver Canucks players
Victoria Cougars (WHL) players
Winnipeg Jets (1979–1996) players